HMS Madagascar was a 46-gun fifth-rate , built at Bombay and launched on 15 November 1822.

Madagascar delivered Bavarian Prince Otto, who had been selected as the King of Greece, to his new capital Nafplion in 1833. In 1843, Madagascar was assigned to suppress the slave trade, which was illegal in Britain. Operating off the west African coast, it successfully detained the Portuguese slave schooner Feliz in 1837, the Brazilian slave ships Ermelinda Segunda (detained 1842), Independencia (1843), Prudentia (1843) and Loteria (1843), and the Spanish slave brigantine Roberto (1842), along with two other vessels of which the nationalities were not recorded. In 1848, Madagascar became a storeship, first in Devonport and then at Rio de Janeiro after 1853. She was sold in 1863.

Commanding officers
 1815 – Thomas Gwyther RN
 1830 – Sir Robert Spencer, second son of the Earl of Spencer died aboard ship in Malta.
 1830–1834 – captain Edmund Lyons
 1838–1839 – Provo Wallis, KCB, East Indies
 1840 – Out of Commission
 1841–1844 – captain John Foote, west coast of Africa
 1847 – Robert Mann
 1853 – John William Finch, storeship, Rio de Janeiro, Brazil
 1855 – John Ptolemy Thurburn, storeship, Rio de Janeiro, Brazil
 1856 – John Mortimer Leycester, storeship, Rio de Janeiro, Brazil
 1859–1863 – Vice Admiral Richard Dunning White, CB, storeship, Rio de Janeiro, Brazil

Citations

External links
 

1822 ships
Seringapatam-class frigate